Barren Island is one of the Falkland Islands, lying south west of East Falkland and south east of George Island. It is separated from Lafonia by Eagle Passage.

It, together with George Island is run as a sheep farm and the tourism there is well run. The island is free of rats, and this is important for the survival of small songbirds.

There are two listed buildings on Barren Island, a house and a woolshed.

References

Islands of the Falkland Islands